Maurice Ronald MacNab, born in Hythe, Kent on 6 May 1902 – 12 April 1962, was an English cricketer. MacNab was a left-handed batsman whose bowling style is unknown, but it is known he bowled with his left-arm.

MacNab made his only first-class appearance for Wales against the Marylebone Cricket Club in 1930. In this match, he took the wicket of Reginald Covill, while with the bat he scored a single run in the Welsh first-innings before being dismissed by Ewart Astill, while in their second-innings he was dismissed for 2 runs by Harold Pickthall. MacNab later made his debut for Denbighshire in the 1934 Minor Counties Championship against Durham. He made a further two Minor Counties Championship appearances for the county, both of which came against Northumberland in 1934 and 1935.

He died in Marian-glas, Anglesey on 12 April 1962.

References

External links
Ronald MacNab at ESPNcricinfo
Ronald MacNab at CricketArchive

1902 births
1962 deaths
People from Hythe, Kent
English cricketers
Wales cricketers
Denbighshire cricketers